WAPE-FM (95.1 MHz "The Big Ape") is a commercial FM radio station in Jacksonville, Florida.  It is owned by Cox Radio and airs a Top 40 (CHR) radio format. Its transmitter is located in Downtown Jacksonville, off Gator Bowl Boulevard.   The studios and offices are located on Central Parkway in Jacksonville's  Southside section.

WAPE's effective radiated power is 100,000 watts.  WAPE is licensed for HD Radio operations but currently has no secondary channel.

History
In 1949, the station first signed on as WJAX-FM, the FM counterpart to WJAX. The two stations were owned by the City of Jacksonville.  They simulcasted their programming, and were NBC Radio Network affiliates.  WJAX-FM originally ran at only 7,700 watts, a fraction of its current power.  Through the 1950s and 60s, WJAX-AM-FM carried a full service middle of the road music format.

Around 1970, WJAX-FM switched to an album rock format.  In the 1970s, WJAX-FM got a power boost to its current 100,000 watts, able to cover Jacksonville and its growing suburbs, from Southeast Georgia down to St. Augustine and Gainesville.

From the mid-1970s until 1986, WJAX-FM was successful as an urban contemporary station. In March 1986, it flipped to a Top 40/urban hybrid format (also known as "CHUrban", which would be the forerunner to what is now rhythmic contemporary) as WAPE-FM under their brand new moniker "Power 95 WAPE".  WAPE-FM is the second outlet in Jacksonville to use the call sign and format, which was originally on the AM band at 690 kHz. WAPE-FM was Jacksonville's dominant hit music station from the mid 1980s to the early 1990s.

In 1993, the station's CHUrban format and "Power 95" branding were replaced with a Hot AC format as "WAPE 95.1, Today's Best Music with No Rap or Hard Rock". In 1997, WAPE returned to their Top 40/CHR roots as "95.1 WAPE".

In 1998, the station was bought by Capstar, Inc., a forerunner of iHeartMedia, Inc.  In 2000, WAPE-FM was acquired by Atlanta-based Cox Radio.

Past air personalities
Some of WAPE's alumni, from both AM 690 and FM 95.1, include the late great Jay Thomas, Douglas "The Greaseman" Tracht, Cleveland Wheeler, Honest John, Mark "The Unknown DJ" Driscoll, Kandy Klutch, Hoyle Dempsey, Marjorie "Marge Fizzy" Lou, Tommy Murphy, Ross Earl, JJ The Night Guy, Tony Mann, Mark "Mark The Shark" Fisher, Billy Goat, Chase Daniels, Jay Styles, Dave O, The Tin Man, Dani, Steve Sutton, Christopher "Trane On The Radio" Trane, Patricia "Pat" Harrison, Just Jim, Aaron Daniels, Dino, Gregory Tanner, CC Rider, Miss Lara, Spoon, Amadeus, Eden Kendall, Michael Knight, Russ The Hammer, Cadillac Jack, with Billy "Wild Bill" Miller, and the iconic mascot that made WAPE-AM and WAPE-FM a legend all over Jacksonvile and beyond The Big Ape.

References

External links

APE-FM
Contemporary hit radio stations in the United States
Cox Media Group